Aku ja köyhät pojat (Aku and the Poor Boys) is Eppu Normaali's sixth album, released on June 5, 1983. It was different from their previous album Tie vie, because they did not use piano at all; as a result, the music is more guitar-based.

Track listing 
All Songs Written & Arranged by Martti & Mikko Syrjä.
Rakkaus on KuuMaa (Love is Earth-Moon)  4:05
Uni laulusta (Dream of a song) 2:16
Toivomuskirjeitä jumalille (Wishing letters to Gods) 3:24
Rakastavaiset (Lovers) 3:55
Vaikerrus d-mollissa (Wail in d-minor) 4:23
Balladi kaiken turhuudesta (Ballad of everything's futility) 4:38
Mopolla tähtiin (Moped to stars) 3:10
Kiistän kaiken (I deny everything) 3:47
Kiirastulen kerubi (Purgatory's cherub) 4:10
Onnellinen hetki elämässä (Happy moment in life) 3:06

Trivia

The album was named after a CCR album called Willy and the Poor Boys, which follows the format of their previous release, Akun tehdas.

Eppu Normaali albums
1983 albums